Xanthobasis is a genus of bristle flies in the family Tachinidae. There are at least three described species in Xanthobasis.

Species
These three species belong to the genus Xanthobasis:
 Xanthobasis angustifrons Aldrich, 1934
 Xanthobasis neopollinosa Blanchard, 1966
 Xanthobasis pollinosa Aldrich, 1934

References

Further reading

External links

 
 

Tachinidae